Kali is a Hindu goddess.

Kali may also refer to:

Arts, entertainment and media

Film and television
 Kali (film), a 2016 Indian film in Malayalam
 "Kali", a two-part episode of Sanctuary (season 2)

Radio stations
 KALI (AM), a radio station in California, U.S.
 KALI-FM, a Vietnamese language radio station in California, U.S.
 KMRB, KALI until June 1999, a radio station in California, U.S.

Other uses in arts, entertainment and media
 Kali (character), in the 1911 novel In Desert and Wilderness
 Kali (chhand), a genre of Punjabi poetry and singing
 Kali (poem), a 1990 poem by Rukmini Bhaya Nair
 Kali Theatre, a British theatre company
 Kali (Tyeb Mehta), a 1997 painting
 Kali, an asteroid in Arthur C. Clarke's novel The Hammer of God
 My.Kali, an online pan-Arab LGBT magazine

People
Kali (name), including a list of people with the given name, surname or nickname
Kali (Bulgarian singer) (Galina Dimitrova Ivanova, born 1975)
Kali (French singer) (Jean-Marc Monnerville, born 1959)
Kali (footballer) (Carlos Manuel Gonçalves Alonso, born 1978), Angolan footballer
Kali (painter) (Hanna Weynerowska, 1918–1998), Polish painter

Places
 Kali, Benin
 Kali, Croatia 
 Kali, India
 Kali (Daulat Khan), Yavatmal district, Maharashtra, India
 Kali, Iran (disambiguation), or Koli
 Kali, Togo
 Kali River (disambiguation)

Religion
 Kali (demon), a Hindu evil entity
 Kali Yuga, the age of Kali in Hinduism
 Kali, a birth name of Satyavati, a character in the Mahabharata
 Saint Sarah, or Kali Sara, patron saint of the Romani people

Science and technology
 Kali (software), an IPX emulator
 KALI (electron accelerator), developed in India
 Kali Linux, a Linux distribution for digital forensics

Other uses
 Kali (fish), a genus of snaketooth fish 
 Kali (plant), a genus of plants including tumbleweed
 Kali language, Niger-Congo language of Cameroon
 Alice International Airport, Texas, U.S., ICAO airport code KALI
 Arnis, or Kali, the national martial art of the Philippines
 Kayah Li alphabet, ISO 15924 code kali
 Kvass, or kali, a traditional fermented Slavic and Baltic beverage
 Sherbet (powder), or kali a fizzy powder sweet
 Kali (restaurant), a Michelin-starred restaurant in Hollywood, California

See also

 Carly, a name
 Galle, a major city in Sri Lanka
 Kalis (disambiguation)
 Kaali (disambiguation)
 Kal (disambiguation)
 Kala (disambiguation)
 Kalki (disambiguation)
 Kall (disambiguation)
 Kalu (disambiguation)
 Karli (name)
 Khali (disambiguation)
 Mahakali (disambiguation)